Sicilian Americans (Sicilian: Sìculu-miricani; Italian: Siculoamericani) are Americans of Italian Sicilian birth or ancestry. They are a large ethnic group in the United States.

The first Sicilians who came to the territory that is now the United States were explorers and missionaries in the 17th century under the Spanish crown. Sicilian emigration to the United States then increased significantly in the starting from before 1880 to 1906, Direct connections by sea departed from the ports of Palermo and Castellammare del Golfo.

Since emigration from Sicily began in the United States before the unity of Italy, and reached its peak at a time when regional differences were still very strong and marked, both linguistically and ethnically, many of the Sicilian immigrants identified (and still identify) primarily on a regional rather than a national basis. Today, there are many studies also dedicated to the history of Sicilian Americans.

The Sicilian-American community includes people born in Sicily who immigrated to the United States, or born in the United States to Sicilian parents, as well as their third, fourth, etc. generation descendants, who identify as belonging to such community.

History

Sicilian emigration to the United States grew substantially starting in the 1880s to 1914, when it was cut off by World War I. Many Sicilians planned to return home after a few years making money in the United States, but the wartime delay allowed many to assimilate into better jobs and wartime experience, so they did not return. By 1924, about 4,000,000 Sicilians emigrated to the US. The Emergency Quota Act, and the subsequent Immigration Act of 1924 sharply reduced immigration from Southern Europe except for relatives of Sicilians already in the U.S. This period saw political and economic shifts in Sicily that made emigration desirable. There was also a large wave of immigration after World War II. A great portion of the Sicilian immigrants would settle in New York City, New Jersey, New Haven, Buffalo, Rochester, Erie, Tampa, Pittsburgh, Chicago, Boston, Pittston, Johnston, Rhode Island, Detroit, Philadelphia, Los Angeles, San Francisco, New Orleans, Milwaukee, and Birmingham.

During the 1800s, Italian Americans, particularly Sicilians, were often not considered “white.” Upon immigration, many were required to list their race as “Southern Italian” or “Sicilian” rather than white. In certain parts of the South during the Jim Crow era, Sicilian even more so than Italians generally were affected by its discriminatory policies. Sicilians were sometimes more prone to discrimination than other Mediterranean groups (such as Northern Italians or Greeks). This led to one of the most notable hate crimes against Sicilian Americans, which was the trial of nineteen Sicilian immigrants for the murder of New Orleans police chief David Hennessy in 1890, which trial ended in the lynching of eleven of them by a white vigilante group.

Culture 
Sicilian immigrants brought with them their own unique culture, including theatre and music. Giovanni De Rosalia was a noted Sicilian American playwright in the early period and farce was popular in several Sicilian dominated theatres. In music Sicilian Americans would be linked, to some extent, to jazz. Three of the more popular cities for Sicilian immigrants were New York City (especially Brooklyn), New Orleans and Chicago. The latter two cities were pivotal in the history of jazz. In New York City, the predominantly Sicilian neighborhoods prior to World War II were East Harlem and Elizabeth Street in Harlem and Little Italy, respectively, in Manhattan, Bushwick, Carroll Gardens and East Williamsburg in Brooklyn, and the predominantly Sicilian neighborhoods after World War II were Bensonhurst, Dyker Heights, and Gravesend, all in Brooklyn; in Chicago, "Little Sicily" was predominantly Sicilian, and in New Orleans, "Little Palermo", the lower French Quarter, was mostly Sicilian. One of the earliest, and among the most controversial, figures in jazz was Nick LaRocca, who was of Sicilian heritage.  Modern Sicilian-American jazz artists include Bobby Militello and Chuck Mangione.

In 1892 Mother Cabrini arrived in New Orleans and opened an orphanage which became Cabrini High School in 1959. 

The Sicilian-American respect for San Giuseppe (St. Joseph) is reflected in the celebration of the Feast of St. Joseph, primarily in New Orleans and Buffalo, every March 19.  Many families in those cities prepare a "St. Joseph's Day table", at which relatives or neighbors portray Jesus, Joseph and Mary and oversee the serving of meat-free Lenten meals to the poor of the community.  The tables are the vestiges of a Sicilian legend which states that farmers prayed to St. Joseph, promising that if he interceded in a drought, they would share their bounty with the poor.  The foods served at such tables include: Pasta con le sarde (spaghetti with sardines); lenticchie (lentils); and various froscie (omelettes) made with cardoon (wild artichoke), cicoria (dandelion) and other homely vegetables.  Desserts include sfingi, zeppoli, a light puff pastry; sfogliatelle, pignolati, struffoli (honey balls); and cannoli, a Sicilian creation.  One tradition has each guest at a St. Joseph's Day table receiving a slice of orange, a bit of fennel and a fava bean, for good luck.

Notable people

See also
List of Italian Americans

References

Further reading
 Gabaccia, Donna. From Sicily to Elizabeth Street (State University of New York Press, 1984).
 Gabaccia, Donna. Militants and Migrants: Rural Sicilians Become American Workers (Rutgers University Press, 1988).
 Mazzucchelli, Chiara. “Heart of My Race”: Questions of Identity in Sicilian/American Writings (Florida Atlantic University Press, 2007).
 Raab, Selwyn. Five Families: The Rise, Decline, and Resurgence of America's Most Powerful Mafia Empires (St. Martin's Press, 2005_.
 Rudolph, Laura C. "Sicilian Americans." in Gale Encyclopedia of Multicultural America, edited by Thomas Riggs, (3rd ed., vol. 4, Gale, 2014, pp. 151-163). Online
  Schiavelli, Vincent. Bruculinu, America: Remembrances of Sicilian-American Brooklyn'' (1998).

External links
Every culture.com
Arba Sicula (A Sicilian American organization) 
Sicilian American Theater
Magna GRECE Ethno-cultural journal for people of Southern-Italian descent

European-American society
Sicilian American
Sicily